Ravshan Bozorov (born 10 May 1968) is a former footballer and trainer from Uzbekistan. He played in the position of forward. Bozorov is one of the best top goalscorers in the history of uzbek football with 316 goals in all tournaments and various leagues.

Playing career
He started his career in 1985 at Surkhon Termiz which played one of the regional zones of Soviet Second League. Bozorov played from 1986 to 1989 for Surkhon. In 1990–1991 he played for Pamir Dushanbe in Soviet Top League.
In 2004, he became best goalscorer of Tupolang Sariosiyo with 44 goals and gained promotion to the top division with his club. Bozorov scored in his next season in Tupolang 9 goals, playing in Uzbek League.

During his career he played for many clubs from various divisions. Only in top Uzbek League he played in over 300 matches and scored over 170 goals. He is member of the "Club 200 of Berador Abduraimov" founded 2001 by initiative of Uzbekistan Football Federation, club of the best goalscorers in uzbek football with over 200 goals. Ravshan Bozorov completed in his career 20 football seasons and scored 316 goals.

Managing career
He started his managing career at FK Dinamo Samarqand in 2009 as he was appointed as assistant coach to Azamat Abduraimov. In 2011, he moved to Lokomotiv Tashkent as assistant to Vazgen Manasyan. From 2012 he was head coach of Lokomotic reserve youth squad and also worked in club Youth academy.
On 3 June 2014 he was appointed as head coach of NBU Osiyo.

On 2 July 2016 Bozorov was appointed as head coach of Navbahor Namangan replacing at this position temporarily appointed interim Mustafo Bayramov. On 6 November 2016 he was sacked after unsatisfying and weak matches of Navbahor.

Honours

Club
 Neftchi
Uzbek League (3): 1992, 1993, 1994
Uzbek Cup (1): 1994

 Tupolang Sariosiyo
Uzbekistan First League runners-up: 2004

Individual
 Uzbek League Top Scorer: 1994 (26 goals)
 Uzbekistan First League Top Scorer: 2004 (44 goals)

References

External links

Ravshan Bozorov – uzfootball.uz 

1968 births
Living people
People from Fergana
Association football forwards
Soviet Top League players
Soviet footballers
Uzbekistani footballers
Uzbekistan international footballers
Uzbekistani football managers
Pakhtakor Tashkent FK players
FK Dinamo Samarqand players
PFC Lokomotiv Tashkent managers